Ilkashevo (İlkäş) is a rural locality (a selo) in Alkinsky Selsoviet, Chishminsky District, Bashkortostan, Russia. The population was 210 as of 2010. There are 4 streets.

Geography 
Ilkashevo is located 5 km northeast of Chishmy (the district's administrative centre) by road. Chishmy is the nearest rural locality.

References 

Rural localities in Chishminsky District